Józef Nawrot (24 September 1906 – 24 September 1982) was a Polish international footballer who played for the national team during the 1920s and 1930s. He was one of the top scorers in the Polish First Division Ekstraklasa with over 100 goals. During his career he played for Cracovia, Legia Warsaw and Polonia Warsaw. He appeared 19 times for his country, scoring 16 goals.

References

External links

1906 births
1982 deaths
Footballers from Kraków
MKS Cracovia (football) players
Legia Warsaw players
Polonia Warsaw players
Poland international footballers
Polish footballers
Association football forwards